The Royal Artillery Gold Cup is a National Hunt steeplechase in Britain which is open to horses aged six years or older. 
It is run at Sandown Park over a distance of about 3 miles (3 miles and 37 yards, or )  and during the race there are 22 fences to be jumped. It is scheduled to take place each year in February.

The race was first run in 1863, took place at Sandown Park for the first time in 1878 and has been run there continuously since 1921. Runners in the race have to be owned or leased by serving or past members of the Royal Artillery and must be ridden by serving or past members of the British Armed Forces. A similar race, the Grand Military Gold Cup, takes place at Sandown Park in March. Captain Guy Disney's victory on Rathlin Rose in 2017 was the first race win by an amputee rider at a British racecourse.

Winners since 1983

See also 
 Horse racing in Great Britain
 List of British National Hunt races

References 

Racing Post:

Sandown Park Racecourse
National Hunt chases
National Hunt races in Great Britain
Recurring sporting events established in 1863
1863 establishments in England
Royal Artillery